Stereotactic injection is a procedure in which a computer and a 3-dimensional scanning device are used to inject anticancer drugs directly into a tumor.

Stereotactic injection may also refer to the use of injections during stereotactic surgery to precisely target specific sites, such as brain regions, during experimental research.

External links
 Stereotactic injection entry in the public domain NCI Dictionary of Cancer Terms

References 

Surgical oncology